Smyczek is a Polish surname. Notable people with the surname include:

Karel Smyczek (born 1950), Czech film director, actor and screenwriter
Tim Smyczek (born 1987), American tennis player
Reinhold Smyczek (1918–1994), Polish military officer and emigrant activist

Polish-language surnames